Tapas or Tapasya is an Indian given name. It may refer to:

Etymology

Tapas (Sanskrit: तपस्) is a concept in Indian religions that refers to a variety of ascetic practices including austerities and penance.

People in performing arts
 Tapasya Nayak Srivastava, television actress
 Tapas Paul (1958-2020), actor and politician
 Tapas Relia, music composer and producer
 Tapas Sargharia, Ollywood film director
 Tapas Sen (1924-2006), stage lighting designer

Other people
 Tapas Kumar Kundu (born 1962), molecular biologist
 Tapas Posman (born 1973), Papua New Guinean footballer
 Tapasyananda (1904-1991), senior monk of the Ramakrishna Mission

See also

 Tapa (disambiguation)

Indian given names